Karnata Bharata Kathamanjari is the Kannada rendering of the great Indian epic, Mahabharata. This is written by Kumara Vyasa. It has only the first 10 chapters of the original work.

The work has been written in Bhamini Shatpadi, a poetic style of Kannada. For most of the work, the poet relies on the original work for the story line. The work is famous for the abundance of metaphors, and the poet has been aptly called the king of metaphors.

The work deviates from the original work at many places, especially when the poet has to deal with Karna.

Renowned Gamaka scholar, the late Shri M S Ananthapadmanabha Rao, has completed the remaining eight parvas (chapters) which Kumara Vyasa left incomplete. These eight parvas (chapters) are in the same Bhamini Shatpadi style of poetry and comprise over eight thousand poems. These poems, completing the work of Kumara Vyasa, were compiled in the form of Karnata Bharata Kathamanjari and was released in the year 2002. Shri M S Ananthapadmnabha Rao was awarded the prestigious Kannada Sahitya Academy award in the year 1977–78 for his service to the field of Kannada literature.

The last 8 chapters of the work was later also written in the same style by another poet, in a work titled Uttara Bharata.

References

Further reading 
 
 

Hindu texts
Mahabharata